Jablanovo is a small village in the municipality of Bijelo Polje, Montenegro. It is located close to the Serbian border.

Demographics
According to the 2003 census, the village had a population of 58 people.

According to the 2011 census, its population was 54.

References

Populated places in Bijelo Polje Municipality
Serb communities in Montenegro